Khejra Kamal is a village in the Bhopal district of Madhya Pradesh, India. It is located in the Berasia tehsil, on the Berasia-Vidisha road.

Demographics 

According to the 2011 census of India, Khejra Kamal has 37 households. The effective literacy rate (i.e. the literacy rate of population excluding children aged 6 and below) is 58.18%.

References 

Villages in Berasia tehsil